Eliri is an ethnic group part of the Sudanic people cluster within the Sub-Saharan African affinity bloc. This people group is only found in Sudan. The members of this group speak Eliri and live in South Kurdufan. This group numbers fewer than 10,000 members. Their primary language is Sudanese Arabic. The primary religion practiced by the Eliri is Islam, a monotheistic religion built around the teachings of the Qur'an and of the prophet Muhammad.

References

Nuba peoples
Ethnic groups in Sudan